Amir Arsalan-e Namdar is a popular Persian epic, which was told to Nasser al-Din Shah Qajar, the Qajar Shah of Persia in the 19th century (though the Persian legend itself is much older), by a storyteller named Mohammad Ali Naqib ol-Mamalek.  Mohammad never transcribed the poem himself, but the daughter of the Shah—who also loved the story—eventually transcribed it and preserved it for posterity.

Plot 
The epic narrates the adventures of its protagonist, Arsalan. The story begins with the Banu (lady) of Roum (the Arabian-Parsi name for Eastern Roman Empire or also known as Constantinople). Roum was conquered by European invaders, and its pregnant Banu forced to flee for her life. She is wedded to an Egyptian merchant and gives birth to her child, Arsalan. The merchant claims the child as his own. Eventually, of course, Arsalan learns of his royal lineage and decides to reclaim his throne.

Adaptations 
This story was adapted as a screen play by Shapor Yasami in 1954, with actor Iloosh Khooshabeh portraying Arsalan. The story was also adapted into a musical film in 1965 with a script written by Esmail Koushan and Mohammad Ali Fardin playing the role of Arsalan, to much success.

 is a Japanese fantasy novel series written by Yoshiki Tanaka loosely based on this epic. It was first published in 1986 and ended in 2017 with sixteen novels and one side-story in the official guidebook Arslan Senki Dokuhon.

Arslaan, an Indian fantasy television series produced by Sagar Arts based on the epic, aired on Sony TV in 2008 and starred Neil Bhatt in the titular role of Arsalan.

See also 
Aslan (disambiguation)
Shamshir-e Zomorrodnegar
Fulad-zereh
Cup of Jamshid

References

External links
Encyclopedia Iranica, Amir Arsalan
 Online PDF text of Amir Arsalan
About the original storybook

Persian mythology
Persian literature
Iranian folklore